Irish college may refer to:
Irish colleges, immersive Irish-language courses run during the summer
Irish Colleges, centers for educating Irish Catholic clergy
Third-level education in the Republic of Ireland